Paspalum setaceum is a species of grass known by several common names, including thin paspalum. It is native to the Americas, where it can be found in the eastern and central United States, Ontario in Canada, Mexico, Central America, and the Caribbean. It can be found in other areas of the world as an introduced, and often invasive, species, including many Pacific Islands. It is a weed of lawns and turf.

This grass is a perennial with erect or prostrate stems that can exceed one meter in length. The flat leaf blades are hairless to slightly hairy. They vary in color. The panicle has up to 6 branches up to 17 centimeters long lined with small oval to rounded spikelets. There are several varieties of this species which can be distinguished in part by color. Some authors do not recognize varieties.

Varieties include:
Paspalum setaceum var. ciliatifolium (fringe-leaf paspalum) - dark green or purplish leaf blades. Widespread. Grows as a weed in the Pacific Islands.
Paspalum setaceum var. longepedunculatum (barestem paspalum) - yellow-green leaf blades
Paspalum setaceum var. muhlenbergii (hurrahgrass) - North America
Paspalum setaceum var. psammophilum (sand paspalum, beadgrass, slender beadgrass, tufted beard-grass) - hairy leaf blades. East Coast of the United States.
Paspalum setaceum var. setaceum (thin paspalum) - hairy gray-green leaf blades
Paspalum setaceum var. stramineum (yellow sand paspalum) - yellow-green to dark green leaf blades
Paspalum setaceum var. villosissimum (hairy paspalum) - gray-green leaf blades

References

setaceum
Flora of North America
Grasses of North America
Warm-season grasses of North America
Grasses of Canada
Grasses of the United States
Native grasses of the Great Plains region
Flora of the United States
Flora of the Western United States
Flora of the Eastern United States
Plants described in 1803